My First School is a Singaporean Chinese drama series which is telecast on Singapore's free-to-air channel, Mediacorp Channel 8. The series began production in November 2015 and made its debut on 12 April 2016 and ended on 31 May 2016. This sitcom consists of 8 episodes, it stars Julie Tan , Chen Liping , Youyi , Xiang Yun & Aloysius Pang as the casts of this series.  The series is jointly presented by NTUC First Campus and the Lien Foundation.

Cast

Xu Leqing's Family

My First School

Production 
This drama series takes its name from My First Skool, a preschool chain owned by NTUC (which sponsors this show) as one of its social enterprises.

Accolades

See also
 List of programmes broadcast by Mediacorp Channel 8
 List of My First School Episodes

References

Singapore Chinese dramas
2016 Singaporean television series debuts
2016 Singaporean television series endings
Mediacorp Chinese language programmes
Channel 8 (Singapore) original programming